The Kostin House is a building in the  of Rostov-on-Don, Russia. The house is located at 37  at the intersection of Chekhov Prospekt (formerly Maly Lane) and Suvorov Street (formerly Malaya Sadovaya Street). The Kostin House has the status of an object of cultural heritage of regional significance.

History
The building was erected in the late 19th century as a revenue house. Its owners were the Rostov merchant Yefim Yakovlevich Kostin and his wife Domna Ivanovna Kostina. They also owned  in a building next to the Kostin House. By resolution № 411 of the Rostov Oblast Administration on 9 October 1998 the house was designated an object of cultural heritage of regional significance. In the 2000s the building was restored. The ground floor is currently occupied by shops and a restaurant.

Description 
The Kostin House was built in the Russian Revival style. The facade is rusticated, and decorated with lesenes, horizontal cornices above rectangular windows and a blind arch above the only round window. A cornice above small corbels crowns the top of the building.

References 

Buildings and structures in Rostov-on-Don
Tourist attractions in Rostov-on-Don
Cultural heritage monuments in Rostov-on-Don
Russian Revival architecture
Cultural heritage monuments of regional significance in Rostov Oblast